Long Pine or Long Pines may refer to:

Long Pine, Nebraska, a city in Nebraska
Long Pine Creek, a stream in Nebraska
Long Pine Formation, a geologic formation in Nebraska
Long Pine National Forest, a forest in Montana
Long Pines, a mountain range in Montana